A political faction of a political entity  is a  group of people that has interests or opinions different from the rest of the entity.

See also
 Intragroup conflict (infighting)
 Ley de Lemas
 Partisan (politics)
Schism

References

Politics